Spravedlnost, (more rarely Irigt) is a hill, shrouded in legend, in the extreme east of Bohemian Switzerland.

The basalt peak rises south of the village of Nová Doubice (Neudaubitz) on the old road to Chřibská (Kreibitz). On the southern slopes of the hill lie the houses of Liščí Bělidlo (Irichtbleiche) that belong to the municipality of Chřibská.

External links 
Irichtberg
Hörndl legend

Mountains and hills of the Czech Republic
Mountains and hills of Bohemian Switzerland
Děčín District